The women's 63 kg competition in judo at the 2016 Summer Olympics in Rio de Janeiro was held on 9 August at the Carioca Arena 2.

The gold and silver medals were determined by a single-elimination tournament, with the winner of the final taking gold and the loser receiving silver.  Judo events awarded two bronze medals.  Quarterfinal losers competed in a repechage match for the right to face a semifinal loser for a bronze medal (that is, the judokas defeated in quarterfinals A and B competed against each other, with the winner of that match facing the semifinal loser from the other half of the bracket).

The medals were presented by Alex Gilady,  IOC member from Israel, and the gifts were presented by Mr. Habib Sissoko, member of the International Judo Federation Executive Committee.

Results

Finals

Repechages

Pool A

Pool B

Pool C

Pool D

References

External links
 

W63
Judo at the Summer Olympics Women's Half Middleweight
Women's events at the 2016 Summer Olympics
Olympics W63